The Eredivisie ("Premier League") was, during its existence, the only professional ice hockey league in the Netherlands and the highest level of competition organized by the Nederlandse IJshockey Bond (NIJB; English: "Dutch Ice Hockey Federation"). Formed in 1945 and playing continuously since 1964, the league mainly featured Dutch teams, although in some seasons certain Belgian teams competed. The league featured a mix of Dutch, European and overseas players.  The winner of the Eredivisie was crowned the Dutch National Champion and represented the Netherlands in the IIHF Continental Cup.  In 2015, with most of its teams facing financial problems and its top team, Tilburg Trappers, joining the German Oberliga, the Eredivise was suspended with the remaining teams joining the BeNe League.

Teams
The league had many different teams during its existence.  The financial viability of teams and availability of an arena often determined which cities participated in any given year. The teams in its final year of competition were:

Format 

The league's format changed from year to year depending on the number of teams and the format of the Dutch Cup Tournament.  As an example, in the 2013-14 year, the league had a 36-game regular season, followed by a best-of five semi-finals amongst the top five qualifiers and a best-of-five final for the Dutch championship.

History

Formation 

The Dutch ice hockey Eredivisie was formed after World War II, with teams in Amsterdam, The Hague and Tilburg. It suspended operations from 1950 to 1964, but has organized a season of competition annually ever since. Over the years the number of teams competing fluctuated between 3 and 10 (currently 7), and the number of games played in the regular season between 4 and 36.

Recent History 

For the 2008-2009 Eredivisie season, the Utrecht Dragons and Eindhoven Kemphanen joined the league.  In 2009-2010, Utrecht returned to the Eerste Divisie.  Prior to the 2010-2011 season, Amstel Tijgers, one of the oldest teams in the league, dropped out, as did Groningen Grizzlies after three seasons, due to poor results on the ice and low revenues.  In 2010, a new team, the Zoetermeer Panthers, won the Dutch Cup but dropped out of the first North Sea Cup tournament due to financial problems.

For two seasons, 2010–11 and 2011–12, the league's regular season consisted of a tournament with several Belgian teams called the North Sea Cup.  The two countries maintained distinct national cups and national championship playoffs during these years.  The Belgian teams, namely HYC Herentals, Turnhout White Caps, and Leuven Chiefs, struggled on and off the ice in the new league, with smaller budgets and fewer imported players than their Dutch counterparts.  By the end of the second North Sea Cup season, Leuven and Turnhout had dropped out of the league.  The North Sea Cup was disbanded in the summer of 2012 when the lone remaining Belgian team, HYC Herentals, was admitted as a full member of the Dutch Eredivisie.

For 2013-14, the Amsterdam G's, which replaced the Amstel Tijgers for 2011-2012 and 2013-2013, ceased operations after financial problems and back-to-back last place finishes, while the Dordrecht Lions began play in the Eredivisie.  However, financial strains on several clubs and a wide disparity between the quality of the teams took a toll on competition and attendance.  In 2015, the consistently strongest team of the league, Tilburg Trappers, joined the German Oberliga.  This prompted the remaining teams of the Eredivisie to join with the top amateur teams in the Netherlands and Belgium to form the BeNe League, to provide greater financial stability and more balanced competition.

Other Leagues 

In the Netherlands, below the Eredivisie was the Eerste Divisie (First Division), the country's top amateur ice hockey league. There was no relegation or promotion between the Eredivisie and the Eerste Divisie.  Some cities (such as Tilburg and The Hague) had hockey clubs operating a professional team in the Eredivisie and a separate amateur team in the Eerste Divisie.  All other Dutch hockey leagues are recreational leagues.  Dutch Eredivisie and Eerste Divisie teams competed against each other for the Dutch Cup, a tournament that was played before and during the Eredivisie regular season.

In Belgium, the Belgian National League operated as the league with the top Belgian teams, apart from HYC Herentals which played in the Eredivisie.  Herentals competed in the Belgian Cup tournament but in the Dutch national championship tournament.

Upon the demise of the Eredivisie, the remaining Eredivisie teams merged with the Eerste Divisie and Belgian National League teams to form the BeNe League.

Champions

Dutch Eredivisie national champions since 1946:

Notable ex NHL players

Karl Dykhuis
Yutaka Fukufuji
Alexander Selivanov
Zarley Zalapski
Jason Lafreniere
Roger Kortko
Jeff Paul
Rick Boh
John Wensink
Jaroslav Sevcik
Dale Henry
Paul Houck
Dan Bourbonnais
Jozef Cierny
Michel Galarneau
Mark Pederson
Dale Weise
Mark Botell

Notable ex NHL coaches
Fred Shero
Lou Vairo

References

External links
Official website
Year-by-year team standings in the Eredivisie since 1946

  
1
Ice hockey leagues in Belgium
Defunct ice hockey leagues in Europe
1945 establishments in the Netherlands
2015 disestablishments in the Netherlands
Sports leagues established in 1945
Sports leagues disestablished in 2015